Tuktagulovo (Tuqtağol) is a rural locality (a selo) in Bishkurayevsky Selsoviet, Tuymazinsky District, Bashkortostan, Russia. The population was 658 as of 2010. There are 5 streets.

Geography 
Tuktagulovo is located 30 km east of Tuymazy (the district's administrative centre) by road. Bulat is the nearest rural locality.

References 

Rural localities in Tuymazinsky District